Summers County Schools is the operating school district within Summers County, West Virginia. It operates one comprehensive secondary school with grades 6-12 and three elementary schools with grades Pre-K through 5. It is governed by the Summers County Board of Education.

Schools

Secondary Schools
Summers County Comprehensive High School (6-12)

Elementary Schools
Jumping Branch Elementary School (PK-5)
Hinton Area Elementary School (PK-5)
Talcott Elementary School (PK-5)

External links
Summers County Schools

School districts in West Virginia
Education in Summers County, West Virginia